Croatia rediviva: Ča, Kaj, Što – baštinski dani is a Croatian poetical manifestation, gathering poets of all Croatian dialects functioning as literary languages.

The founder of the festival is the Croatian poet, physician and ambassador Drago Štambuk. He is also the author of the Wall of Poetry (Zid od versi) at the central square in Selca, onto which plates of the wreathed poets (poetae oliveati) are mounted, with engraved year of the wreathing, name of the poet and a few verses carved into the Bračian marble. The principal idea of the festival is that of the threefoldness of Croatian, and the idea of koinéisation (mixing) of all three Croatian dialects (Čakavian, Kajkavian and Štokavian) as an expression of language commonness. Organisers of the manifestation are the association "Hrvatski sastanak 1888" and the Croatian Writers' Association.

The festival is held annually in the village of Selca at the island of Brač, usually in mid-July, even though there were cases where it was held earlier, such as the first one which was held on Holy Saturday, March 30, 1991. Poets read their own verses, in one of the three Croatian literary idioms, at the main stone-covered square of "Stjepan Radić" in front of an audience.

The festival includes a selection of the most successful poet, who is "crowned" with the wreath of olive leaves. The decision is made by a three-member jury composed of the founder and earlier wreathees (oliveati).

The crowned poet (poeta oliveatus) and the founder then choose the verses that shall be engraved into the marble plate and mounted onto the Wall of Poetry of the central Selcan square, in front of the church of the Christ the King.  The plate is of white Brač marble.

Every five years the founder edits and publishes the selection of the poems that were read during the festivals of the period, entitled Maslinov vijenac ("The olive wreath").  So far three titles have been published (1996, 2001, and 2005).

The wreathed poets - poetae oliveati

 1991: Zlatan Jakšić 
 1992: Drago Štambuk
 1993: Jakša Fiamengo
 1994: Božica Jelušić
 1995: Vesna Parun
 1996: Luko Paljetak
 1997: Tonko Maroević
 1998: Ivan Golub
 1999: Vlasta Vrandečić Lebarić
 2000: Slavko Mihalić
 2001: Dragutin Tadijanović
 2002: Zvonimir Mrkonjić
 2003: Petar Gudelj
 2004: Sonja Manojlović
 2005: Tatjana Radovanović
 2006: Mate Ganza
 2007: Joško Božanić
 2008: Mladen Machiedo

References
 

Literary festivals in Croatia
Croatian literary awards
Brač
Autumn events in Croatia
Festivals established in 1991
1991 establishments in Croatia
Croatian poetry